Jonathan Sewell (born Jonathan Sewall; June 6, 1766 – November 11, 1839) was a lawyer, judge and political figure in Lower Canada.

Early life
He was born in Cambridge, Massachusetts, the son of Jonathan Sewall, the last British attorney general of Massachusetts and Esther Quincy. After a group of patriots attacked the family's residence, the Sewalls moved to Bristol, England; they adopted the spelling Sewell for the family name at this time. He attended Brasenose College, Oxford and then went to New Brunswick in 1785, where he studied law with Ward Chipman. He was named registrar of the Vice Admiralty Court for New Brunswick in 1787. In 1788, he was called to the bar and set up practice.

Career
The following year, he moved to Quebec City and qualified as a lawyer there. In 1790, he served as interim attorney general for the province. In 1793, Sewell was named solicitor general and inspector of the king's domain and, in 1795, he became attorney general and advocate general in Lower Canada. In 1796, he was appointed judge in the Vice-Admiralty Court at Quebec. On September 24 that same year, he married Henrietta, daughter of chief justice William Smith. He was elected to the Legislative Assembly of Lower Canada for William-Henry (later Sorel) in 1796. In the house, he was often called on to draft bills, but with regard to government business, he normally played a role secondary to that of leaders of the English party such as John Young and Pierre-Amable de Bonne. He supported the party, except on two controversial issues — the financing of prisons in 1805 and the expulsion of Ezekiel Hart, a Jew — in which his legal opinions obliged him to break rank. He remained in the assembly until 1808.

Sewell helped introduce the Better Preservation Act of 1797 which allowed the suspension of habeas corpus in cases of suspected treason. In 1797, he prosecuted David McLane for treason, who was executed. He prepared legislation which led to the establishment of the Royal Institution for the Advancement of Learning (later McGill College) in 1801. In 1808, he was named Chief Justice for Lower Canada and became a member of the Executive Council of Lower Canada. Later in 1808, he was appointed to the Legislative Council and was named speaker in 1809. Sewell supported a union of Upper and Lower Canada. However, in 1822, he opposed a legislative union because of the strong opposition in the province. In 1809, he published rules of practice for the Quebec Court of King's Bench and the Court of Appeals; James Monk published similar rules at Montreal, Lower Canada.

In 1814, the legislative assembly voted to impeach Sewell and Monk on the grounds that some of their rules of practice were actually legislation, the responsibility of the legislature. Sewell successfully defended himself against the charges in London. On the bench, he endorsed the use of civil law based on French traditions and criminal law modelled after English norms. Sewell resigned from the Executive Council in 1830 after the assembly requested for judges to be excluded from serving on the council. He resigned from his position of chief justice in 1838 for ill health.

Sewell was elected as a member of the American Philosophical Society in 1830.

He died November 11, 1839 in Quebec City. His residence, at 87 Saint-Louis Street, Quebec City, was designated a National Historic Site of Canada in 1969.

Personal life
Sewell also led an amateur orchestra and performed violin in a quartet at Quebec City and opened the Theatre Royal there in 1832. He helped found the Literary and Historical Society of Quebec and served as its president from 1830 to 1831.

His brother Stephen was a member of the legislative assembly and served as solicitor general for Lower Canada.

References

Bibliography
 
 
 Halpenny, Francess, ed. "Jonathan Sewell." Dictionary of Canadian Biography, 1836-1850, Vol. 7, Toronto: University of Toronto Press, 1988. p. 782-91. 

1766 births
1839 deaths
Members of the Legislative Assembly of Lower Canada
Members of the Legislative Council of Lower Canada
Chief justices of Lower Canada
People educated at Bristol Grammar School
Persons of National Historic Significance (Canada)
Attorneys-General of Lower Canada
Quincy family